Sergio (Serđo) Blažić "Đoser" (8 April 1951 – 18 January 1987) was a Croatian hard rock musician, best known as the lead vocalist of popular hard rock band Atomsko sklonište.

Biography
Blažić was born on 8 April 1951 in Pula. He started his career as a rock singer in Pula rock band King Stones, then he was in bands Hush and Koper-based Boomerang, and then in 1976, became a member of hard rock band Atomsko sklonište. He was the lead singer and also co-writer of the band, recording seven studio albums and gaining great popularity.

In 1983, with Atomsko sklonište in the United States, Blažić released the album Space Generation for the American market. After returning to Pula with the band, he recorded two more albums. However, he was suffering from Hodgkin's disease, which he contracted in 1971. The band last performed with Blažić on 21 July 1986, in a farewell concert in a Pula nightclub named "Piramida". They performed that day in the band's standard line-up: Dragan Gužvan, Bruno Langer, Zdravko Širola and Blažić, reinforced by Eduard Kanler on keyboards.

He died as a result of Hodgkin's disease in Pula on 18 January 1987. It is reported that more than 4,000 people attended his funeral two days later, on 20 January.

Legacy
In memory of Blažić's musical activities and the fight against Hodgkin's disease, the Sergio Blažić-Đoser Memorial was held in Pula from 1988 to 2008. In 2014, a green area in Krležina street in Pula was named Poljana Sergio Blažića-Đosera after him.

Discography

With Atomsko sklonište

Studio albums
Ne cvikaj, generacijo (1978)
Infarkt (1978)
U vremenu horoskopa (1980)
Extrauterina (1981)
Mentalna higijena (1982)
Space Generation (as Atomic Shelter, 1983)
Zabranjeno snivanje (1984)

Live albums
Atomska trilogija (1980)
Jednom u životu (1985)

Compilations
'76 - '86 Kolekcija hitova Vol.2

References

External links

Sergio Blažić at barikada.com

1951 births
1987 deaths
Croatian rock singers
Yugoslav male singers
People from Pula